James Fitton (10 April 1805 in Boston, Massachusetts, U.S.A. – 15 September 1881 in Boston) was an American Catholic priest and missionary, active in New England.

Biography
His father, Abraham Fitton, went to Boston from Preston, England; his mother was of Welsh origin and a Catholic convert. His primary education was received in the schools of his native city, and his classical course was made at Claremont, New Hampshire, at an academy conducted by Virgil Horace Barber, a Catholic convert. He learned theology from Bishop of Boston, Benedict Joseph Fenwick, by whom he was ordained priest, 23 December 1827.

In 1828, he was sent as a missionary to the Passamaquoddy people. He subsequently labored among the scattered Roman Catholics of New Hampshire and Vermont, and soon the territory between Boston and Long Island was placed under his charge, with Hartford, Connecticut, as the center of his district. He travelled, often on foot, from Eastport and the New Brunswick line on the northeast, to Burlington and Lake Champlain on the northwest; from Boston in the east, to Great Barrington and the Berkshire Hills in the west; from Providence, Rhode Island and Newport, Rhode Island in the southeast, to Bridgeport and the New York State line in the southwest. During his missionary career, he was pastor of the first Catholic church at Hartford, and at Worcester, Massachusetts. By 1836, he had stationed his headquarters in Worcester. This was also the same year that the Penobscot Indians began making annual visits to St. John’s Parish, camping on Vernon Hill before returning to Maine.

He erected the church of Our Lady of the Isle at Newport. In 1840, while pastor of the church at Worcester, he purchased the site of the College of the Holy Cross, and erected a building for the advanced education of Catholic young men. In 1842, he deeded the grounds and building to Bishop Fenwick, who placed it under the care of the Jesuits. In 1855 he was appointed by Bishop Fenwick pastor of the church of the Most Holy Redeemer in East Boston. Here he worked for the remaining twenty-six years of his life, and built four more churches. He was instrumental in establishing the first Roman Catholic newspaper in the United States.

References

1805 births
1881 deaths
College of the Holy Cross people
American Roman Catholic missionaries
Roman Catholic missionaries in the United States
Clergy from Boston
American people of English descent
American people of Welsh descent
19th-century newspaper founders
19th-century American Roman Catholic priests